Ras al-Ein (lit. Head of the Spring) is a small Arab village in northern Israel, located in the Galilee, near the Tzalmon Stream. It falls under the jurisdiction of Misgav Regional Council.

History
The village was recognized by the state in 1996. Half of its residents are members of the Suad Bedouin tribe and the other half are Christian Arab members of the Nicola family.

See also
Arab localities in Israel

References

Arab villages in Israel
Bedouin localities in Israel
Arab Christian communities in Israel
Populated places in Northern District (Israel)
1996 establishments in Israel